Baek Seung-hyeon (born Baek Seung-wook on March 1, 1975) is a South Korean actor. Baek has starred in supporting roles in television series such as Cain and Abel (2009), Brilliant Legacy (2009), and Prosecutor Princess (2010).

Filmography

Film

Television series

Awards and nominations

References

External links 
 
 
 

1975 births
Living people
South Korean male television actors
South Korean male film actors
Chung-Ang University alumni
Male actors from Busan
21st-century South Korean male actors